Gareth Herbert is a male former international table tennis player from England.

Table tennis career
He represented England at two World Table Tennis Championships in the Swaythling Cup (men's team event) from 2000-2001.

He won a gold medal at the 2002 Commonwealth Games in the doubles with Andrew Baggaley. He also won three English National Table Tennis Championships titles.

Style of play
A forehand-oriented player, Herbert was notable for his skill as a server.

See also
 List of England players at the World Team Table Tennis Championships

References

English male table tennis players
1980 births
Living people
Black British sportspeople
Commonwealth Games gold medallists for England
Table tennis players at the 2002 Commonwealth Games
Commonwealth Games medallists in table tennis
Medallists at the 2002 Commonwealth Games